Comet Man (Stephen Beckley) is a fictional character appearing in American comic books published by Marvel Comics.

Publication history
Comet Man was the subject of a limited series in 1987, created by Bill Mumy, Miguel Ferrer, and Kelley Jones. Comet Man first appeared in Comet Man #1 (February 1987), and appeared in the rest of the series from Comet Man #2-6 (March–July 1987). Comet Man and Max also appeared in Fantastic Four #315 to #317 (June–August 1988). The storyline of the limited series was concluded in issues #50-53 of Marvel Comics Presents (May–July 1990). Comet Man returned in issue #4 of Captain Marvel (May 2000) and later made appearances in other Marvel Comics series.

Fictional character biography

Early life
Dr. Stephen Beckley was the son of Jack Beckley of the United States Air Force. Stephen's parents did not take too well to the news Jack was leaving for the South Pacific as a Naval pilot. Jack did not know his fiancée was carrying his child; she moved to Florida, where the child, John, was put up for adoption. Upon his return as a war hero, Jack married; he fathered two more children: Stephen and Rosemary.

John grew up to found a top secret intelligence agency known as the Bridge. John held the title of 'The Superior'. When his own father told him that he had one son, John became enraged and arranged an accident that killed him.

Stephen Beckley became an astronomer and astrophysicist. He had a son, Benny, by way of Ann. They ran the Edmon project, which investigated astronomical incidents. Stephen piloted a craft through a tail of a comet and met Max, a being from the so-called Colony Fortisque. Max claimed his race is responsible for starting evolution on Earth and other planets in the Milky Way Galaxy.

Origin
Max accidentally vaporized Beckley when they met. He used his technology to recreate Beckley, which granted Beckley various superpowers. Upon Beckley's return to Earth, he was taken prisoner by David Hilbert, an old friend and secret 'Bridge' operative, and underwent various tests while his wife continued to believe he was dead.

Beckley escaped; his wife, also a prisoner, died in a separate attempt. Benny survived and Dr. Fishler put him under tests to try to duplicate Stephen's new powers.

Beckley made an ally in Reed Richards, who gave him a device to allow him to teleport more easily. He learned that his wife was dead; S.H.I.E.L.D. told him of his brother. He found his son, injured, and saved his life, granting him a copy of Beckley's powers. Stephen seemingly died. Benny was enraged by the sequence of events he had seen. He killed Fishler and fell into a catatonic state. Hilbert, now repentant, vowed to take care of Benny.

'Bridge' assassins attempted to claim Max and his ship. Max's pacifist tendencies evaporated and he erupted into violence. The men fled and Max decided to destroy Earth to neutralize their violent ways. Beckley calmed Max down and agreed to accompany him on a visit to the Fortisquian colony.

'The Superior' almost killed Max and Stephen but they escaped to the colony unscathed. Stephen gained more control over his powers on Max's home world. Both returned to Earth. Stephen found his sister and son living with John. Comet Man used his powers to free Benny from his catatonic state. Ultimately, Comet Man learned John was the Superior, who was then compelled by Benny's psychic powers to shoot and kill himself.

The Initiative
Stephen tried to help some S.H.I.E.L.D. agents trying to take down the Superhuman Registration Act violator Cybermancer during the Civil War, but was defeated.  Stephen was considered a "potential recruit" for the Initiative program.

Powers and abilities
Comet Man can teleport himself over vast distances, from Earth to any location in outer space. The limits on Comet Man's teleportation range are as yet unknown. Comet Man's teleportation ability is triggered subconsciously when he is in danger. He can utilize his teleportation power consciously through the use of a "psiamplifier" device given to him by Reed Richards. Comet Man can teleport himself into the presence of another person by concentrating on that person, even if Comet Man does not know where that person is. Apparently, Comet Man subconsciously psionically scans the area to which he teleports himself to make sure he does not materialize within a solid object.

Comet Man can psionically project a portion of his own consciousness into the mind of another human being or the mind of an animal. In this way Comet Man can read the memories of that other human being or animal and can even influence the thoughts and emotions of that person or animal. Comet Man refers to this power as "thought pitching." As a side effect of receiving psionic abilities, Comet Man's capacity for feeling emotions himself has increased.

Comet Man possesses superhuman strength, and durability, a regenerative healing factor and telekinesis which he uses to fly, create protective fields, and project destructive blasts.

References

Notes

 

1987 comics debuts
Comics characters introduced in 1987
Fictional astronauts
Fictional astronomers
Fictional astrophysicists
Fictional characters with superhuman durability or invulnerability
Marvel Comics characters who can move at superhuman speeds
Marvel Comics characters who can teleport
Marvel Comics characters with accelerated healing
Marvel Comics characters with superhuman strength
Marvel Comics mutates
Marvel Comics scientists
Marvel Comics titles